The Voith DIWA automotive transmission was designed by Voith primarily for city-buses and suburban buses. The transmission utilizes a Differential-Wandler (Converter) or DIWA which replaces two gears which would be used on a conventional transmission. Voith has designed many variations and generations of the Voith DIWA.

History Evaluation

DIWA (D851/D854/D854G)

Three/four front speed, four-speed G version (for example, Metroliner D854G), add a set of 1.36:1 reduction gear to the output

Three-stage throttle sensor (there are two switches on the inside), the throttle depth corresponding to each stage needs to be manually adjusted

The shifting speed is divided into four stages with the same force (three-stage throttle + kickdown)

The hydraulic retarder will go out when the vehicle speed is too low, and it will turn a gear at the same time.

All oil valves are on-off, and the force of biting the clutch is controlled by adjusting the working/o of a gearbox.

DIWA 2 (D851.2/D854.2/D854.2G/D863/D864)

T0, T1 two types of turbines, R0, R1 two types of rear gear planetary gears

Automatic neutral selection when parking

Individual oil valves can be operated between torque converter pressure and operating pressure, whichever is higher

DIWA 3 (D823.3/D851.3/D854.3/D863.3/D864.3/D883.3/D884.3)

No G version

Reworked gearbox computer

Uninterrupted throttle sensor (at least seven-stage throttle + kickdown) / signal by trip computer

Newly added input speed sensor and back gear planetary gear ring speed sensor, the former is used to check the difference between input and output speed when rotating the gear, and the latter is used to check the back gear planetary gear when the retarder is locked for more precise control.

The hydraulic retarder will go out when the vehicle speed is too low. After turning back for a gear, gently bite the back gear and slow down.

The oil circuit is controlled, especially the oil pressure of the torque converter is controlled.

Most oil valves can independently sense and control the output oil pressure (any 0-100% of the operating pressure), and control the clutch force more accurately and timely. The operating pressure is always kept at 100%, so there is no need for accumulation delay.

DIWA.3E (D823.3E/D851.3E/D854.3E/D863.3E/D864.3E/D883.3E/D884.3E/D381.4)

Additional SensoTop

D381.4 is D851.3E with a different planetary gear and input flange configuration

DIWA.5 (D824.5/D854.5/D864.5/D884.5)

Full-line of four-speed version

Six types of pump wheels: L, F, G, V, X, H

DIWA.6 (D824.6/D854.6/D864.6/D884.6)

Stop-Start System added
The operating pressure will be adjusted according to the situation. It is necessary to increase it first, which can reduce unnecessary load of the oil pump and save fuel.

DIWA.NXT or DIWA.8 (D827.8/D857.8/D867.8/D887.8/D897.8)

Mild hybrid system added
Six speed instead of three speed

Gear ratios 
D200, D506 (wide-ratio)

D501, D506 (close-ratio)

D854 (D851 is 3 forward+reverse with the same ratios), DIWA.4

DIWA.5, DIWA.6

See also
List of Voith transmissions

References

Automotive transmission technologies